was a body of the Japanese government that investigated accidents regarding boats and other marine equipment.

It was established in June 1949. It was housed in the 2nd Building of the Central Common Government Office at 2-1-2 Kasumigasaeki in Chiyoda, Tokyo. On October 1, 2008 the Aircraft and Railway Accidents Investigation Commission (ARAIC) and the JMAIA merged, producing the Japan Transport Safety Board.

References

External links

 Japan Marine Accident Inquiry Agency (English) (Archive)
 Japan Marine Accident Inquiry Agency (Japanese) (Archive)
 Japan Marine Accident Inquiry Agency (Japanese) (Archive)

Marine Accident Inquiry Agency
Organizations disestablished in 2008
1949 establishments in Japan
Organizations established in 1949
Maritime safety organizations